Margaret (Peggy) Delaney is marine geochemist known for her research on trace elements to examine changes in ocean chemistry over time.

Education and career 
Delaney earned her B.S. in chemistry from Yale University in 1973 and a Ph.D. from the Massachusetts Institute of Technology/Woods Hole Oceanographic Institution Joint Program (1983). Following her Ph.D., Delaney joined the University of California Santa Cruz in 1983, and later became chair of the Ocean Sciences Department. At the time of her retirement in 2020, Delaney was Vice Chancellor for Planning and Budget at the University of California Santa Cruz.

In her service to the community, Delaney was the editor of the journal Paleoceanography and Paleoclimatology from 1996 to 1999. In 2005, Delaney started a three-year term as editor of the journal Earth and Planetary Sciences. She was also involved in the leadership and management of the Ocean Drilling Program (ODP) and the Integrated Ocean Drilling Program (IODP).

In 2004, Delaney was elected a fellow of the American Geophysical Union and the citation noted her:

Research 
Delaney's research used geochemical measurements to examine changes in ocean chemistry. She looked at concentration of trace elements in shells of foraminifera and was the first to show that changes in the ratios of elements such as lithium, strontium, and calcium were linked to environmental conditions experienced by the foraminifera. These elemental ratios in corals can be used to reconstruct ocean chemistry and Delaney examined trace element levels in corals found at the Galapagos Islands. In marine sediments, Delaney examined the accumulation of phosphorus in the equatorial Pacific, tracked phosphorus from riverine sources and particles to the seafloor. Delaney applied these geochemical tools to studies of the Pliocene, the Paleocene-Eocene Thermal Maximum, and changes in the ocean currents around Antarctica.

Selected publications

Awards and honors 
 Fellow, American Geophysical Union (2004)
 Fellow, The Oceanography Society (2005)
 Outstanding Educator Award, Association for Women Geoscientists (1993)

References 

Fellows of the American Geophysical Union
Yale College alumni
Massachusetts Institute of Technology alumni
University of California, Santa Cruz faculty
Women oceanographers
Marine geologists
Year of birth missing (living people)
Living people